Mohe is a county-level city in Daxing'anling Prefecture, Heilongjiang province. It is the northernmost city in China.

Administrative divisions 
Mohe City is divided into 6 towns:

Geography

A village, the northernmost Chinese settlement, at the latitude of 53° 29' N known as the Beiji Village (literally "North Pole Village" or "Northernmost Village") lies in this city, on the Amur River. 

On extremely rare occasions, the aurora borealis can be seen.

This creates a population density of only 4.64 persons/km2 (12.0 persons/sqmi).

Maps

Climate
Mohe, by virtue of its far northern location and proximity to Siberia, is one of the few locations in China with a subarctic climate (Köppen Dwc), with long, severe winters, and short, warm summers. Winter begins in early to mid-October and lasts until late April or early May, and temperatures then are normally the coldest nationwide. Average temperatures stay below freezing for a total of nearly seven months of the year, and the frost-free period is just short of 90 days; in addition, the diurnal temperature variation is large, averaging  annually.

Transportation

Mohe railway station, opened in 1972, is the northernmost railway station in China. It has regular passenger service to Harbin, Qiqihar and Shenyang.

Mohe Gulian Airport, opened 2008, is the nation's northernmost airport and the first Chinese airport built on permafrost.

Notable people
 Chi Zijian

In popular culture
 Mohe is the destination of both the main character and his fictional hero in Xiaolu Guo's film How Is Your Fish Today? (Jin tian de yu zen me yang?) (2006).

See also
 List of extreme points of China

Sources

External links
Mohe People's Government website 

County level divisions of Heilongjiang